An der Poststraße is a municipality in the Burgenlandkreis district, in Saxony-Anhalt, Germany. It was formed by the merger of the previously independent municipalities Klosterhäseler, Wischroda and Herrengosserstedt, on 1 July 2009.

Etymology 

The name An der Poststraße translates as at the post road and is derived from the "old post road" between Leipzig and Kassel. This route was of importance until the "Frankfurt-Leipziger-Chaussee" was rolled out through Eckartsberga, Gernstedt and Kösen in the year 1806.

Subdistricts 
The following subdistricts belong to the An der Poststraße municipality:

References

Burgenlandkreis